AllTrack is a US-based performing rights organization (PRO) that represents independent artists, songwriters, composers, producers, and publishers for the licensing and collection of their performing rights royalties. Its members are compensated when their original songs (also commonly referred to as compositions or works) are publicly performed in more than 120 countries around the world.

History 
AllTrack Performing Rights was founded by  Hayden Bower, launched in beta in 2018 and officially launched in 2019. AllTrack's team of executives were previously employed at SESAC, Rumblefish, Tunecore, Songs, Bicycle and Bug Music.

References

External links 

Music licensing organizations